Hanna Orthmann (born 3 October 1998) is a German volleyball player who plays for Türk Hava Yolları SK in the Turkish Women's Volleyball League (Turkish: Sultanlar Ligi). She participated in the 2018 FIVB Volleyball Women's Nations League.

Career 
Hanna Orthmann played youth volleyball at SC Union 08 Lüdinghausen. In 2014 she came to the Volleyball training camp at USC Münster, where she first played in the youth team in the second Bundesliga Nord. At the end of 2015, she had their first Bundesliga appearance on 17 January 2016 in the 0-3 defeat against NawaRo Straubing. In 2017 she moved to the Italian Serie A to ProVictoria Pallavolo Monza.

From 2012 to 2016, Hanna Orthmann also played in the German youth and junior national team. She played at the 2015 FIVB Volleyball Girls' U18 World Championship in Peru. At the 2016 World Grand Prix Orthmann had their first appearances in the senior team. She played with the 2016 UEFA European Under-19 Championship in Hungary and Slovakia.

Awards

Individual
 2020 European Olympic Qualification Tournament "Best Outside Spiker"

References 

1998 births
Living people
German women's volleyball players
People from Memmingen
Sportspeople from Swabia (Bavaria)